Ostrich: Journal of African Ornithology is a journal of African ornithology published by BirdLife South Africa, formerly the South African Ornithological Society, in association with the National Inquiry Services Centre (NISC) and Taylor & Francis.  It contains papers on the birds of Africa and its islands, including peer-reviewed original scientific papers of 3000 to 5,000 words, short articles of up to 3000 words, perspectives, commentaries and reviews.  Topics include behaviour, breeding, biology, conservation, ecology, migrations, movements and systematics. This is a hybrid journal: offering open access publishing, but also following the standard publishing model without charges to authors.

The journal achieved its highest ever 5-year impact factor in 2020 of 1.255. The highest impact factor was 1.364 for 2020. The CiteScore has been a consistent 1.3 over the 2017-2019 period.

Previous editors include: Austin Roberts, R Bigalke, J Vincent, G.J. Broekhuysen, M.K. 'Bunty' Rowan, Gordon Maclean, Alan Kemp, Adrian Craig, Richard Dean, Ara Monadjem, Lizanne Roxburgh. The current Editor-in-Chief is Alan Lee as of 2016.

See also
 List of ornithological journals

References

External links
 BirdLife South Africa

Journals and magazines relating to birding and ornithology
Quarterly journals
Publications established in 1930